The 1996 Pacific Challenge was a rugby league tournament held between Pacific teams. The tournament was played over eight days and in six countries. It featured an uneven draw with every team playing twice, except for Tonga and the New Zealand XIII side who both played three times, and no final.

Background
The tournament was a hastily arranged replacement for the cancelled 1996 Pacific Cup which eventually took place as the 1997 Oceania Cup. The tournament was held during the Superleague war that was severely affecting international rugby league at this time.

Squads
The Cook Islands included Sonny Shepherd and Richard Piakura.
Coached by Cameron Bell, the New Zealand Māori squad included Sonny Whakarau, Frank Watene, Paul Rauhihi and Matthew Sturm.
The New Zealand XIII were coached by Gerard Stokes, captained by Whetu Taewa and included Willie McLean, Earl Va'a, Brian Jellick, Denvour Johnston, Jerry Seuseu, Stuart Lester, Boycie Nelson, Doc Murray, David Bailey and Ben Lythe.
Tonga included Paul Koloi and Esau Mann.
Western Samoa included Paki Tuimavave and Mike Setefano.

Results

References

Pacific Cup
Pacific Cup
Pac
International rugby league competitions hosted by New Zealand